Larmour is a surname. Notable people by that name include:

 Albert Larmour (born 1951), former Northern Irish professional footballer. 
 Alwin Corden Larmour (1886–1946), British churchman, school teacher and philatelist.
 Davy Larmour (boxer) (born 1952), former boxer from Northern Ireland.
 Davy Larmour (footballer) (born 1977), retired football player.
 Jordan Larmour (born 1997), Irish rugby player.
 Noel Larmour (1916-1999), Irish cricketer and politician.